Gymnosoma hamiense is an Asian species of fly in the family Tachinidae.

References

Phasiinae
Diptera of Asia
Insects described in 1966